PS Rose was a paddle steamer passenger vessel operated by the London and North Western Railway from 1876 to 1894.

History

She was built by Cammell Laird for the London and North Western Railway in 1876.

References

1876 ships
Passenger ships of the United Kingdom 
Steamships
Ships built on the River Mersey
Ships of the London and North Western Railway 
Paddle steamers of the United Kingdom